A Fischbrötchen (pl. "Fischbrötchen", lit. fish roll) is a sandwich made with fish and other components such as fresh white or dried onions, pickles, remoulade, creamy horseradish sauce, ketchup, or cocktail sauce. It is commonly eaten in Northern Germany, due to the region's proximity to the North Sea and Baltic Sea.

A common preparation is made with bismarck herring or soused herring. Other varieties use Brathering, rollmops, European sprat, salmon, smoked Atlantic mackerel, fried Atlantic cod, and other fish varieties (e.g., fish burgers). Prawns are sometimes used, as are various other species of food fish. Fischbrötchen are commonly served at fast food stands or take-out restaurants.

The Hanover Fair was initially colloquially known as the "Fischbrötchen fair" due to the fish buns served there as a snack.

Gallery

See also
 Balık ekmek
List of sandwiches

References

External links
 

Fast food
German cuisine
North German cuisine
Fish dishes
Seafood sandwiches
German sandwiches
Pages translated from German Wikipedia